The 12495 / 12496 Pratap Superfast Express is a Express train belonging to Indian Railways – North Western Railway zone that runs between  and Kolkata Chitpur in India. It often is delayed nearly by four hours late. The train received its LHB coach.

It operates as train number 12495 from Bikaner Junction to Kolkata and as train number 12496 in the reverse direction, serving the states of Rajasthan, Uttar Pradesh, Bihar, Jharkhand and West Bengal.

Coaches

The 12495/12496 Pratap Express has one AC 2 tier, five AC 3 tier, eight Sleeper class, six Unreserved/General and two EOG coaches. It does not carry a pantry car .

Service

As the average speed of the train is above , as per Indian Railways rules, its fare includes a Superfast surcharge.

Time table

Operation

 12495 Pratap Express runs from Bikaner Junction every Thursday reaching Kolkata on Friday .
 12496 Pratap Express runs from Kolkata every Friday reaching Bikaner Junction on Sunday.

Traction
Since the entire route is yet to be full electrified, a Bhagat Ki Kothi shed WDP-4B hauls the train from Bikaner Junction till  handing over to Howrah-based WAP-7 for the remaining part of the journey till Kolkata.

Rake sharing

The train shares its rake with 22473/22474 Bandra Terminus–Bikaner Superfast Express.

References 

 http://epaper.timesofindia.com/Default/Scripting/ArticleWin.asp?From=Search&Key=TOIKM/2009/12/29/4/Ad00410.xml&CollName=TOI_KoLKATA_ARCHIVE_2009&DOCID=125501&Keyword=%28%3Cmany%3E%3Cstem%3Ebikaner%3Cand%3E%3Cmany%3E%3Cstem%3Ekolkata%3Cand%3E%3Cmany%3E%3Cstem%3Eexpress%29&skin=pastissues2&AppName=2&ViewMode=GIF

External links

Transport in Kolkata
Transport in Bikaner
Named passenger trains of India
Rail transport in Rajasthan
Rail transport in Uttar Pradesh
Rail transport in Bihar
Rail transport in Jharkhand
Rail transport in West Bengal
Express trains in India